Keshav Samant popularly known as Anand Samant  is one of India's most successful contract bridge players. He has represented India in the world championships. In 2009, he was part of India's senior team at the 15th Bridge Federation of Asia and the Middle East (BFAME) championship in Amman, Jordan.

International record

Playing record (team events)

Playing record (pairs or individual events)

Other Team Events Positions

Winners
 Shivchatrapati Award by Maharashtra State Government
 Gurudutta Trophy
 Khosla Trophy
 Holkar Trophy
 Tolani Grand Prix
 Agarwal, Sushania National trophies and other trophies

Member of Bridge Organizations
 Hon. Gen. Secretary, Public Information Officer of Bridge Federation of India
 Secretary for Maharashtra Bridge Association for 10 years.
 Founder member of Thane District Bridge Association.
 Committee member of Contract Bridge Association and Bridge Federation of India

References

External links
 http://www.bfi.net.in
 http://www.samadhanbridgeacademy.com
 http://bridgeinindia.homestead.com/
 http://www.worldbridge.org/
 Anand Samant International Record at the World Bridge Federation

Indian contract bridge players
Living people
Place of birth missing (living people)
Year of birth missing (living people)